A T-square is a technical drawing instrument used by draftsmen primarily as a guide for drawing horizontal lines on a drafting table. The instrument is named after its resemblance to the letter T, with a long shaft called the "blade" and a short shaft called the "stock" or "head".

In addition to drawing horizontal lines, a T-square can also be used with a set square to draw vertical or diagonal lines. The T-square usually has a transparent edge made of plastic which should be free of nicks and cracks in order to provide smooth, straight lines.

T-squares are also used in other industries, such as construction. In woodworking, higher-end table saws often have T-square fences attached to a rail on the front side of the table, providing improved accuracy and precision when cutting wood.

See also
 Technical drawing tools

References

Technical drawing tools
Squares (tool)